Brindavanam is a 2017 Indian Tamil-language comedy drama film directed by Radha Mohan and produced by Shan Sutharsan. The film stars Arulnithi and Vivek, while Tanya portrays the leading female role. Featuring music composed by Vishal Chandrasekhar, the film began production during August 2016 and was released on 26 May 2017.

Cast 

 Arulnithi as Kannan
 Vivek as himself
 Tanya as Sandhya
 Thalaivasal Vijay as Sandhya's father
 Subbu Panchu as Nagaraj
 M. S. Bhaskar as Louis
 Krishnamoorthy as Ramaiah
 Sricharan as Motorcycle Driver
 Doubt Senthil as Varky
 Cell Murugan as Mani

Production 
In June 2016, Shan Sutharsan of Vansan Movies announced that his production studio would simultaneously produce two Tamil films — a project by Radha Mohan and Mahendran Rajamani's Enakku Vaaitha Adimaigal. Arulnithi and Vivek were reported to play leading roles, while newcomer Tanya, granddaughter of actor Ravichandran, was selected as the lead actress. M. S. Prabhu and Vishal Chandrasekhar were revealed as the film's cinematographer and composer, though Prabhu was later replaced by newcomer Vivekanand Santhosham, an erstwhile assistant of P. C. Sriram. Radha Mohan announced actor Vivek would portray himself and the film would be about the bonding between a popular actor and his fan, though distanced reports that the film would be along the lines of the 2016 Hindi film, Fan. To prepare for his role, Arulnithi learnt sign language for ten days from expert Vijaya Bhaskar, who had also trained Jyothika for her role in Radha Mohan's Mozhi.

The film was officially launched with the title Brindavanam in mid August 2016, with Vivek planting a tree sapling to commemorate the start of the film's shoot in Sakleshpur, Karnataka. The director revealed that he opted against naming the film Mozhi 2 despite being tempted to, in order to underplay expectations for the film from audiences. Brindavanam was shot for nine days in Sakleshpur, before the team moved to Ooty for a further 35 days to complete the shoot.

Soundtrack 

The film's music was composed by Vishal Chandrasekhar and featured three songs, all written by Madhan Karky. The audio rights are secured by Vansan Music, a subsidiary of the production house.

Release 
The film opened on 26 May 2017 across Tamil Nadu, alongside Samuthirakani's Thondan (2017).The satellite rights of the film were sold  to Sun TV. The film received positive reviews, with a critic from The Hindu stating it is "a feel-good film that narrates tales of friendship and love" and that "it has got its vision and mission clear – to be heart-warming, funny and emotional at times". The New Indian Express stated it was a "warm, fuzzy film that works for the most part", while The Hindustan Times stated "it leaves you grinning for the most part and also stirs up an emotional storm within". Likewise, India Today called it a "thoroughly entertaining film", while Sify.com's reviewer wrote that "the importance of family, the enduring bond of brotherhood, and the power of forgiveness in the film will surely make you smile".

References

External links 
 

2017 films
2010s Tamil-language films
Indian comedy-drama films
Films shot in Karnataka
Films shot in Ooty
Films scored by Vishal Chandrasekhar
Films directed by Radha Mohan
2017 comedy-drama films